Rajaram College, Kolhapur (Marathi: राजाराम महाविद्यालय, कोल्हापूर) is a government college affiliated to Shivaji University in Kolhapur. It offers junior college-level courses such as 11th & 12th, bachelor degree level courses such as (BSc and BA) in science, humanities, languages and arts and offers an MA in Psychology and Home science. It also runs MSc in Analytical Chemistry It also has a popular junior college offering higher secondary education courses in science and arts.

History
Rajaram college was established in 1880 by the Maharaja of Kolhapur. It is the oldest college in the Kolhapur city and one of the famous college in the Maharashtra. It was affiliated to the Mumbai University and then with Pune university. Shivaji University was established in 1962 and since then it is affiliated with Shivaji University Kolhapur. Many undergraduate and post graduate courses were available in the past which were later moved to the Shivaji university after establishment of the university. Rajaram college had played a key role in the establishment of the Shivaji University Kolhapur and first Vice chancellor of the university was Principal of Rajaram college Dr. A. G. Pawar. Rajaram college has given many great leaders in politics. It is alma mater of many famous scientists, writers, historians, educationists, army officers, and civil servants (IAS, IPS and IFS officers). It celebrated its 125th anniversary in 2005.

The college is located near Shivaji University. Many students from nearby villages study there. It is located somewhat on the outskirts of Kolhapur city. It has a large area of campus where many people from nearby areas come for pleasure walks.

The Maharashtra State supported U.P.S.C and M.P.S.C institute is also present in the same campus.

This college has given many famous dignitaries to India, including IAS and IPS officers who are serving the nation.

The college has a picturesque campus of around 75 acres. Its 13 independent buildings include a 2000 capacity auditorium. The Dr. Balkrishna Library has more than 125,000 volumes.

Notable alumni
 Abhay Ashtekar, scientist, quantum gravity and cosmology
Vishnu Vasudev Narlikar, Indian physicist
 Shivram Bhoje, nuclear scientist
 Yashwantrao Chavan CM, Maharashtra
 Balasaheb Desai, politician
 Gopal Krishna Gokhale, politician
 Vasant Gowarikar, scientist
 Khashaba Jadhav, wrestler, Olympic medalist
 Basappa Danappa Jatti, former Vice-President of India
 Narasimha Chintaman Kelkar, attorney and dramatist
 B. G. Kher, chief minister of Bombay state
 Kusumagraj (Vishnu Vaman Shirwadkar ), writer and poet
 G. D. Yadav, Noted chemical engineer, researcher and educator
 R. Madhavan, Tamil and Bollywood star
 Master Vinayak (Vinayak Karnataki), film actor and producer
 S. B. Mujumdar, founder of Symbiosis Pune
 Dnyaneshwar Mulay, diplomat, author, and columnist
 Arun Nigavekar, chairman of University Grants Commission; vice chancellor, member of science & technology committee to the Prime Minister; founder director of National Assessment & Accreditation Council
 Shalinitai Patil, politician
 D. C. Pavate, educationist
 Govindrao Tembe, music composer
Ranjit Desai, Marathi writer
Dr. Ratnappa Kumbhar, freedom fighter and social worker
Indira Sant, famous poet
Vijaya Rajadhyaksha, writer
Ramesh Mantri, writer
Vinda Karandikar, Marathi poet awarded by Gyanpeeth Award

Notable teachers
 H. P. Gandhi, diatomist; worked at the college as a biology lecturer during the 1950s
 Vinayaka Krishna Gokak (Awarded by Gyanpeeth)
 V. T. Patil, founder of Mouni Vidyapeeth
 Vasantrao Ghatge, founder of Ghatge Patil Transports Pvt. Ltd.
 Dr. Balkrishna, historian and Fellow of the Royal Society of London
 Narayan Sitaram Phadke, writer
 Madhav Tryambak Patwardhan, poet also known as Madhav Julian
 Barr. Balasaheb Khardekar, educationist, member of Lok Sabha and founder of Gokhale College Kolhapur

See also
Education in India
Literacy in India
Degrees in India

References

External links

See No. 14

Universities and colleges in Maharashtra
Education in Kolhapur
Educational institutions established in 1880
1880 establishments in India
Shivaji University